Winter Park may refer to:

 Winter Park, Colorado
 Winter Park, Florida
 Winter Park Company
 Winter Park cluster housing, Melbourne, Australia
 Winter Park High School, Winter Park, Florida
 Winter Park Resort, Winter Park, Colorado
 Fraser–Winter Park station in Fraser, Colorado
 Winter Park station in Winter Park, Florida